Nationality words link to articles with information on the nation's poetry or literature (for instance, Irish or France).

Events
 March – Samuel Taylor Coleridge elected a Fellow of the Royal Society of Literature in Britain.
 February 15 – Lord Byron falls ill at Missolonghi while taking part in the Greek War of Independence, dying of fever on April 19.
 May 7 – Première of Beethoven's Symphony No. 9 (the "Choral") at the Theater am Kärntnertor in Vienna, incorporating a setting of Schiller's "Ode to Joy" (Ode an die Freude, 1785).
 May 17 – The publisher John Murray, together with five of Lord Byron's friends and executors, decides to destroy the manuscript of Byron's memoirs (which he has been given to publish) because he considers the scandalous details would damage Byron's reputation. Opposed only by Thomas Moore, the two volumes of memoirs are dismembered and burnt in the fireplace at the John Murray (publisher)'s office, 50 Albemarle Street in London.
 The United States Literary Gazette, a semi-monthly, begins publication. It publishes poetry by Henry Wadsworth Longfellow and William Cullen Bryant, among many others.

Works published in English

United Kingdom
 Edwin Atherstone, A Midsummer Day's Dream
 Bernard Barton, Revelations of the Dead-Alive
 Robert Bloomfield, The Remains of Robert Bloomfield (posthumous)
 Lord Byron, Don Juan, Cantos XV-XVI (March 24), published anonymously
 Thomas Campbell:
 Miscellaneous Poems
 Theodric, and Other Poems
 Catherine Grace Godwin, The Night Before the Bridal; Sappho; and Other Poems, published under the author's maiden name, "Catherine Grace Garnett"
 William Hazlitt, editor, Select British Poets, anthology
 William Knox, Songs of Israel, including "Mortality", Scotland
 Letitia Elizabeth Landon, writing as "L.E.L.", The Improvisatrice, and Other Poems
 Amelia Opie, The Negro Boy's Tale
 Percy Bysshe Shelley, Posthumous Poems of Percy Bysshe Shelley published in June by Mary Shelley; suppressed at insistence of Sir Timothy Shelley in September; includes "Julian and Maddalo", "The Witch of Atlas", "Prince Athanese", "Ode to Naples", "Mont Blanc", "Alastor, or The Spirit of Solitude", "The Triumph of Life", "Marianne's Dream", "Letter to [Maria Gisborne]"

Biography, criticism and scholarship in the United Kingdom
 Sir Samuel Egerton Brydges, Letters on the Character and Poetical Genius of Lord Byron, criticism
 William Cowper, Private Correspondence of William Cowper, includes some poems

United States
 William Cullen Bryant:
 Monument Mountain, a popular, blank-verse poem about an Indian princess who falls in love with her cousin, then commits suicide
 Mutation
 Royall Tyler, The Chestnut Tree, the author's longest poem presents sketches of those who pass beneath a 200-year-old chestnut tree

Works published in other languages

France
 Victor Hugo, Nouvelles Odes
 Alfred de Vigny, Éloa, ou La sœur des anges ("Éloa, or the Sister of the Angels"), a three-part epic

Other
 Giacomo Leopardi, Italian
Canzoni
Versi
 Wilhelm Müller, German
Gedichte aus den hinterlassenen Papieren eines reisenden Waldhornisten ("Poems from the posthumous papers of a travelling horn-player"), concludes publication
Lieder der Griechen ("Songs of the Greeks"), concludes publication

Births
Death years link to the corresponding "[year] in poetry" article:
 January 25 – Michael Madhusudan Dutta (মাইকেল মধুসূদন দত্ত also spelled "Maikel Modhushudôn Dôtto" and "Datta") (died 1873), born Madhusudan Dutt, Indian Gujarati and English-language poet and dramatist
 April 5 – Sydney Thompson Dobell (died 1874), English
 May 19 – William Allingham (died  1889), Irish
 July 25 – George Boyer Vashon (died 1878), African American lawyer, abolitionist, poet and scholar
 August 15 – Charles Godfrey Leland (died 1903), American folklorist
 August 21 – Caroline Dana Howe (died 1907), American poet, hymnwriter, and author
 September 4 – Phoebe Cary (died 1871), American
 October – James Lionel Michael (died 1868), Australian
 December 10 – George MacDonald (died 1905), Scots writer, poet and Christian minister
 Also – Aristotelis Valaoritis (died 1879), Greek

Deaths

Birth years link to the corresponding "[year] in poetry" article:
 March 2 – Susanna Rowson (born 1762), British-American novelist, playwright, poet, lyricist, religious writer, stage actress and educator
 March 30 – Thomas Maurice (born 1754), English poet and scholar
 April 13 – Jane Taylor (born 1783), English poet and novelist
 April 19 – Lord Byron (born 1788), English poet and romantic hero
 August 15 – Carl Arnold Kortum (born 1745), German writer, poet and physician
 October 17 – Elizabeth Cobbold (born 1765), English poet
 November 23 – Matthäus Casimir von Collin (born 1779), Austrian poet

See also

 Poetry
 List of years in poetry
 List of years in literature
 19th century in literature
 19th century in poetry
 Romantic poetry
 Golden Age of Russian Poetry (1800–1850)
 Weimar Classicism period in Germany, commonly considered to have begun in 1788  and to have ended either in 1805, with the death of Friedrich Schiller, or 1832, with the death of Goethe
 List of poets

Notes

19th-century poetry
Poetry